Ophthalmothrips is a genus of thrips in the family Phlaeothripidae.

Species
 Ophthalmothrips amyae
 Ophthalmothrips breviceps
 Ophthalmothrips conocephalus
 Ophthalmothrips faurei
 Ophthalmothrips formosanus
 Ophthalmothrips lesnei
 Ophthalmothrips longiceps
 Ophthalmothrips miscanthicola
 Ophthalmothrips pomeroyi
 Ophthalmothrips yunnanensis

References

Phlaeothripidae
Thrips
Thrips genera